Hemvärnsmusiken is a division of the Home Guard that heads all 25 bands. It is led by the Home Guard's central music council and performs at 600-700 events each year. There are over 1,000 active musicians in the division. 17 bands are qualified for performance at state ceremonies, royal visits and festivities. Aside from the official bands, Home Guard Bugle Bands also are in service within their respective areas.

History
The Home Guard was formed in 1940 and in May of that year. The first Home Guard Band was formed in Leksand. The number of bands grew gradually. At least about 15 bands operated during the Second World War. There was no formal status for home guard bands, with those bands often being composed of civilians. In 1943, the Stockholm Home Guard Band was formed, being the first official military band. In 1945, the first attempts were made to organize the bands, with provisions being made the provision of uniforms among others. It was not until 1974 that it was decided to form a central body to oversee the interests of the bands. This was manifested into the Home Guard's Central Music Committee (CMN).

Goals
The division has to perform service music at the Home Guard and other Armed Forces activities, festivals and ceremonies as well as official state ceremonies. It is designed to promote and perpetuate Swedish military music traditions.

Home Guard Central Music Council

The Home Guard's Central Music Council (CMR) is a permanent committee attached to the National Home Guard Council and serves as a liaison body between the National Home Guard Chief and the division. It works mainly on educational and organizational issues and also collaborates with the military hierarchy on budgetary and regulatory issues and conducts certain project activities. The CMR consists of six members elected by a Home Defense Music Meeting, as well as a member appointed by the National Chief of Home Guard.

Symbols

Emblem
The division emblem was established in 1986 and is worn by all home defense musicians as a trade mark over the right chest pocket of the uniform. It is also found on sheet music ornaments and trumpet tabs. It consists of the standard weapon of the Home Guard in front of two oblique lyres in gold.

Uniform
Uniform m/1987 is the general uniform of the Home Guard. Some personnel uniforms also have a civilian design with a different name and uniform in parallel with their military function. The Uniform 90 is also worn on certain occasions. Uniforms are regulated by the Armed Forces regulations of 2015. A distinction for the uniforms of Home Guard musicians are the red shoulder flap sleeves along with the shoulder ornament.

Organization of bands
 
The division consists of the following units:

Södertörn Home Guard Band
Borås Home Guard Band
Borlänge Home Guard Band
BohusDal Home Guard Band
Blekinge Home Guard Band
Ängelholm Home Guard Band
Ystad Home Guard Band
Östergötland Home Guard Band
Västmanland Home Guard Band
Uppsala Home Guard Band
Umeå Home Guard Band
Skaraborg Home Guard Band
Norrbotten Home Guard Band
Kristianstad Home Guard Band
Lycksele Home Guard Band
Lund Home Guard Band
Eksjö Home Guard Band
Eslöv Home Guard Band
Guldsmedshyttan Home Guard Band
Gävle Home Guard Band
Göteborg Home Guard Band
Halland Home Guard Band
Jämtland Home Guard Band
Jönköping-Huskvarna Home Guard Band
Kalmar län Home Guard Band

See also
Conscript Band of the Finnish Defence Forces
Forsvarets musikk
Swedish Armed Forces Music Corps
Royal Life Guards Music Band (Denmark)

References

Bibliography

Military music of Sweden
Swedish military bands
1940 establishments in Sweden